Mtiskalta Church  is the church ruins on the left bank of the river East Gumist in the village of , Sokhumi municipality, Autonomous Republic of Abkhazia, Georgia. The church was built in the 19th and 20th centuries. The church walls are in a heavy physical condition and need an urgent conservation.
Not to be confused with nearby Mtiskalta Church of the Transfiguration built in the 19th century.

External links 
 Mtiskalta Church Historical monuments of Abkhazia — Government of the Autonomous Republic of Abkhazia.

References 

Religious buildings and structures in Georgia (country)
Religious buildings and structures in Abkhazia
Churches in Abkhazia